The International Journal of Neuroscience is a peer-reviewed scientific journal that publishes original research articles, reviews, brief scientific notes, case studies, letters to the editor, and book reviews concerned with all aspects of neuroscience and neurology.

Editors 
The Editors-in-Chief of the International Journal of Neuroscience is Dr. Mohamad Bydon.

References 

Neuroscience journals
Publications established in 1978
Taylor & Francis academic journals
Monthly journals